Punk Rock Confidential was a quarterly lifestyle magazine published in San Francisco, California, focusing on the look of punk rock music and lifestyle in its many incarnations.  Started in 2005 by the trio of Fat Mike of NOFX, Sunny Andersen Chanel (Girlyhead magazine) and Kevin Chanel (ChinMusic! magazine), it was essentially an Us or People-esque full-color glossy for alternative types. It was rooted more in whimsy and the ironic inevitability of punk celebrity than anything involving music. The magazine focused on pictures of bands doing real-life activities - partying, getting married, and living. It also contained punk band gossip, rumors, tongue-in-cheek humor, and parodied "celerbrity" magazine content for the punk music genre.

In the first issue the magazine staff gave a summary of their intention for publishing. They looked through other magazines that were around at the time and combined many of the sections and styles that they liked to document the punk community:

Multiple issue covers used the tagline "It's Not About The Music!". Punk Rock Confidential ran several recurring columns such as articles covering births, deaths, and weddings; "Everlasting Jobstoppers", covering controversial or poorly done tattoos that might stop band members from getting a job; "Punks Not Dead, but it ain't getting an younger" - a tribute to bands that had played punk music for more than 20 years; scene reports; CD and DVD reviews; and a crossword. The magazine was published until 2008.

References

External links
 Official website

Lifestyle magazines published in the United States
Music magazines published in the United States
Quarterly magazines published in the United States
Magazines established in 2005
Magazines published in San Francisco
Defunct magazines published in the United States
Magazines disestablished in 2008